{{DISPLAYTITLE:C8H8O2}}
The molecular formula C8H8O2 may refer to:

 Anisaldehyde (p-anisaldehyde)
 Benzodioxan
 3,4-Dihydroxystyrene
 3-Hydroxyacetophenone
 2-Hydroxy-4-methylbenzaldehyde
 4-Hydroxyphenylacetaldehyde
 2-Methoxybenzaldehyde (o-anisaldehyde)
 Methyl benzoate
 Phenyl acetate
 Phenylacetic acid
 Piceol and other hydroxy acetophenones
 Toluic acids
 p-Toluic acid
 o-Toluic acid
 m-Toluic acid